Fischer Lake, just southeast of Florida State Road 429, is a natural freshwater lake west of Orlando, Florida, in Orange County, Florida. This lake is partially  surrounded by residential housing and Camp Ithiel is on its southwest shore. Most of its shores are swampy. It is listed in the Orange County Wateratlas as a private lake and there is no public access along its shores.

References

Lakes of Orange County, Florida